The Erie Railroad  was a railroad that operated in the northeastern United States, originally connecting New York City — more specifically Jersey City, New Jersey, where Erie's Pavonia Terminal, long demolished, used to stand — with Lake Erie, at Dunkirk, New York. It expanded west to Chicago with its 1865 merger with the former Atlantic and Great Western Railroad, also known as the New York, Pennsylvania and Ohio Railroad (NYPANO RR). Its mainline route proved influential in the development and economic growth of the Southern Tier of New York State, including cities such as Binghamton, Elmira, and Hornell. The Erie Railroad repair shops were located in Hornell and was Hornell's largest employer. Hornell was also where Erie's mainline split into two routes, one northwest to Buffalo and the other west to Chicago.

On October 17, 1960, the Erie merged with former rival Delaware, Lackawanna & Western Railroad to form the Erie Lackawanna Railroad. The Hornell repair shops were closed in 1976, when Conrail took over, and repair operations moved to the Lackawanna's Scranton facility. This had a devastating effect on Hornell, from which it has never recovered. (The repair shops have subsequently been used, intermittently, for the assembly of railroad and transit cars, and are now owned by Alstom.) Some of the former Erie line between Hornell and Binghamton was damaged in 1972 by the floods of Hurricane Agnes, but the damage was quickly repaired hand today this line is a key link in the Norfolk Southern Railway's Southern Tier mainline.  What was left of the Erie Lackawanna became part of Conrail in 1976. In 1983, Erie remnants became part of New Jersey Transit rail operations, including parts of its Main Line. Today most of the surviving Erie Railroad routes are operated by the Norfolk Southern Railway.

History

New York and Erie Rail Road: 1832–1861 

The New York and Erie Rail Road was chartered on April 24, 1832, by Governor of New York Enos T. Throop to connect the Hudson River at Piermont, north of New York City, west to Lake Erie at Dunkirk. On February 16, 1841, the railroad was authorized to cross into the northeast corner of Pennsylvania on the west side of the Delaware River, a few miles west of Port Jervis, NY, as the east side was already occupied by the Delaware and Hudson Canal to a point several miles west of Lackawaxen, PA. Construction began in 1836 and was opened in sections until reaching the full length to Dunkirk on May 19, 1851. At Dunkirk, steamboats continued across Lake Erie to Detroit, Michigan. The line crossed the Kittatinny Mountains at 870 feet.

When the route was completed in May, 1851, President Millard Fillmore and several members of his cabinet, including Secretary of State Daniel Webster, made a special, two-day excursion run to open the railway. It is reported that Webster viewed the entire run from a rocking chair attached to a flatcar, with a steamer rug and jug of high-quality Medford rum. At stops, he would step off the flatcar and give speeches.

In 1848, the railroad built the Starrucca Viaduct, a stone railroad bridge over Starrucca Creek in Lanesboro, Pennsylvania, which has survived and is still in use today. In fact, current owner Central New York Railway spent $3.2 million in 2021 centering its single remaining track, re-ballasting and repairing masonry. It is the oldest stone rail bridge in Pennsylvania still in use.

Erie Railway: 1861–1878
In August 1859, the company went into receivership due to inability to make payments on the debts incurred for the large costs of building, and, on June 25, 1861, it was reorganized as the Erie Railway. This was the first bankruptcy of a major trunk line in the U.S.

In the Erie War of the 1860s, four well-known financiers struggled for control of the company; Cornelius Vanderbilt versus Daniel Drew, James Fisk and Jay Gould. Gould ultimately triumphed in this struggle, but was forced to relinquish control in 1872–73 due to unfavorable public opinion following his involvement in the 1869 gold-rigging scandal and to his loss of $1 million of Erie Railroad stock to the British con-man Lord Gordon-Gordon.

In 1869, the railroad moved its main shop facilities from Dunkirk to Buffalo. Rather than demolishing the shops in Dunkirk, the facility was leased to Horatio G. Brooks, the former chief engineer of the NY&E who was at the controls of the first train into Dunkirk in 1851. Horatio Brooks used the facilities to begin Brooks Locomotive Works, which remained in independent business until 1901 when it was merged with seven other locomotive manufacturing firms to create ALCO. ALCO continued new locomotive production at this facility until 1934, then closed the plant completely in 1962.

The cost of breaking bulk cargo in order to interchange with standard gauge lines led the Erie to introduce a line of cars designed to operate on either broad or standard gauge trucks.  Starting in 1871, this allowed interchange traffic by means of truck exchange, including through passenger and freight connections to Saint Louis, Missouri using a Nutter car hoist in Urbana, Ohio.

Beginning in 1876, the Erie began plans to convert its line to standard gauge, as it became clear that the cost of changing from one gauge to another was not justified by the added stability brought by the wider gauge. By the time of its reorganization in 1878, the Erie had built a third rail along the entire mainline from Buffalo to Jersey City. This project all but brought the railroad to bankruptcy.

New York, Lake Erie and Western Railroad: 1878–1895 

The Erie still did not see profits, and was sold in 1878 via bankruptcy reorganization to become the New York, Lake Erie and Western Railroad.

The work of converting the railroad to standard gauge was continued, and, on June 22, 1880, the entire trackage of the Erie was converted to standard gauge.

In 1886, it was reported that the Erie and the Philadelphia and Reading Railway shared ferry services between their two Jersey City terminals, the larger being Pavonia Terminal, and Fulton Ferry in Brooklyn, New York for 11 round trips on weekdays and Saturdays, and four round trips on Sunday. In 1889, it opened a new bridge across the Hackensack River improving service to its terminals.

Erie Railroad: 1895–1960 
By 1893, the New York, Lake Erie and Western Railroad went into bankruptcy reorganization again and emerged in 1895 as the Erie Railroad.

George W. Perkins brought Frederick D. Underwood into the Erie Railroad in 1910. During the eastern railroad strike of 1913 Underwood agreed to accept any ruling made by mediators under the Newlands Reclamation Act. One of the demands made by Erie employees was a 20% increase in wages. Erie management had refused a wage increase, but compromised by asking employees to wait until January, 1915 for any advance. Union leaders agreed to make this an issue which Erie management would settle with its own men. However, W.G. Lee, president of the Brotherhood of Railroad Trainmen, asserted that the only way "to deal with the Erie is through J.P. Morgan & Company, or the banks". Underwood responded from his home in Wauwatosa, Wisconsin, saying "I am running the Erie Railroad: not George W. Perkins, nor J.P. Morgan & Co., nor anybody else."

In the mid-1920s, the successful Van Sweringen brothers of Cleveland, Ohio gained control of the Erie, improving operations (such as standardizing the railroad's locomotives and rolling stock) and bottom-line earnings. Unfortunately, both brothers—who at the time owned several other railroads—died at an early age, but had they lived the shape of railroads in the east would likely look very different today.

Despite the ravages of the Great Depression, the Erie managed to hold its own until it entered bankruptcy on January 18, 1938. Its reorganization, accomplished by December, 1941, included the purchase of the leased Cleveland and Mahoning Valley Railroad, swapping high rent for lower interest payments, and the purchase of formerly-subsidized and leased lines. The reorganization paid off, as the Erie managed to pay dividends to its shareholders after the dust had settled.

In 1938, the Erie Railroad was involved in the famous U.S. Supreme Court case of Erie Railroad Co. v. Tompkins. The Erie doctrine, which governs the application of state common law in federal courts, is still taught in American law schools today.

On September 15, 1948, the Cleveland Union Terminal Company allowed the Erie to use the Union Terminal adjacent to Terminal Tower in lieu of its old station. Also that year,  the Erie purchased a share of the Niagara Junction Railway, along with the New York Central and the Lehigh Valley.

Steam last operated on the Erie on March 17, 1954, when the fires were dropped on K-1 class Pacific locomotive No. 2530, used on a commuter run between Jersey City and Spring Valley, New York.

The Erie prospered throughout the mid-1950s, but then began an irreversible decline. The company's 1957 income was half of that in 1956; by 1958 and 1959, the Erie posted large deficits. The business recession that occurred in the 1950s led the Erie to explore the idea of doing business with the nearby Delaware, Lackawanna and Western Railroad (DL&W). The first result of this was the abandonment of duplicate freight facilities in Binghamton and Elmira, New York. Between 1956 and 1957, the Erie shifted its passenger trains from its Pavonia Terminal to the DL&W's newer Hoboken Terminal. Also, the DL&W's mainline between Binghamton and Elmira was mostly abandoned in favor of the Erie's parallel mainline, in 1958. These successful business consolidations led to merger talks (which, at first, also included the Delaware and Hudson Railroad); on October 17, 1960, the two railroads merged to create the Erie Lackawanna Railroad. Erie's large repair facility in Hornell was closed when Conrail took over in 1976 and operations were consolidated at the Lackawanna's Scranton facility. However, the merged railroad only survived for 16 years before continued decline forced it to join Conrail in 1976.

Year-end mileage operated, including C&E but not NYS&W/WB&E: 2451 route-miles, 6013 track-miles in 1925; 2320 route-miles, 5395 track-miles in 1956. NJ&NY adds 46 route-miles in 1925, 39 in 1956.

The former Erie tracks between Hornell and Binghamton were partially damaged in 1972 by Hurricane Agnes.

Lines operated 

A map from 1960 shows that the Erie had some control over the former Cleveland, Columbus, Cincinnati and Indianapolis Railway and the New York Central from Lawrenceville to Newberry Junction, near Williamsport, PA.

Passenger service 

The Erie Railroad operated a number of named passenger trains, although none were as well-known or successful as others like the Pennsylvania Railroad's Broadway Limited or New York Central Railroad's 20th Century Limited.  Some of the Erie's most well known trains included the Erie Limited, Lake Cities, Pacific Express, Atlantic Express, Midlander, Southern Tier Express and Mountain Express. All of these had their western termini in Chicago, except the Mountain Express which terminated in Hornell, in the Southern Tier of New York.

The Erie operated an extensive network of commuter routes in northern New Jersey and the lower Hudson Valley of New York. Most of these routes became part of Conrail along with the rest of Erie Lackawanna's rail operations in 1976. The New Jersey routes are now part of NJ Transit's Hoboken Division, originating and terminating at Hoboken Terminal. The Hudson Valley routes are now part of Metro-North Railroad.

In addition to its steam and diesel services the Erie also operated an electric commuter rail line to its terminal station in Rochester, New York. The station was one of the Erie's few electrified railroad stations, and the railroad became one of the first to provide electric commuter services in 1907.

Company officers 

 Eleazer Lord (1833–35), (1839–41), (1844–45)
 James Gore King (1835–1839)
 James Bowen (1841–1842)
 William Maxwell (1842–1843)
 Horatio Allen (1843–1844)
 Benjamin Loder (1845–1853)
 Homer Ramsdell (1853–1857)
 Charles Moran (1857–1859)
 Samuel Marsh (1859–1861), (1864)
 Nathaniel Marsh (1861–1864)
 Robert H. Berdell (1864–1867)
 John S. Eldridge (1867–1868)
 Jay Gould (1868–1872)
 John A. Dix (1872)
 Peter H. Watson (1872–1874)
 Hugh J. Jewett (1874–1884)
 John King (1884–1894)
 Eben B. Thomas (1894–1901)
 Frederick Douglas Underwood (1901–1926)
 John Joseph Bernet (1927–1929)
 Charles Eugene Denney (1929–1939)
 Robert Eastman Woodruff (1941–1949)
 Paul W. Johnston (1949–1956)
 Harry W. Von Willer (1956–1960)

Heritage unit
As part of the 30th anniversary of Norfolk Southern Railway being formed, NS decided to paint 20 new locomotives into the paint scheme of predecessor railroads. NS #1068, an EMD SD70ACe, was painted into Erie Railroad's green passenger scheme. It was released on May 25, 2012.

See also

List of Erie Railroad locomotives
List of Erie Railroad structures documented by the Historic American Engineering Record

Notes

References

Further reading
  (excerpt)
 
 Mott, Edward Harold (1908). Between the Ocean and the Lakes: The Story of Erie. New York: Ticker Publishing Co., 1908.

Primary sources 
 Scanned issues of the Erie, Lackawanna, and Erie-Lackawanna magazines, primarily for employees
 
 Erie Railway Tourist, 1874. "The management of the Erie Railway Company presents the Tourist to its patrons, friends, and the general public, in this form, to introduce a more intimate and detailed knowledge of the beauties, advantages, and resources of its line. The route of the Erie Railway is peculiarly rich among American railroads in the variety and extent of its scenery."

External links

Erie page by the Erie Lackawanna Historical Society
Presidents of the Erie Railroad

 
American companies established in 1895
American companies disestablished in 1960
1960 mergers and acquisitions
Former Class I railroads in the United States
Defunct New Jersey railroads
Defunct New York (state) railroads
Defunct Pennsylvania railroads
Defunct Ohio railroads
Defunct Indiana railroads
Defunct Illinois railroads
Standard gauge railways in the United States
6 ft gauge railways in the United States
Predecessors of Conrail
Conrail
Erie Lackawanna Railway
Railroads in the Chicago metropolitan area
Railway companies established in 1895
Railway companies disestablished in 1960
1895 establishments in New York City
1960 disestablishments in Ohio
Defunct companies based in Cincinnati
Defunct companies based in New York City
Historic American Engineering Record in New Jersey
Historic American Engineering Record in New York (state)
Historic American Engineering Record in Pennsylvania
Hornell, New York
Transportation in Steuben County, New York